Donald Blackstone  (born 21 June 1938) known by pen name Don Black is an English lyricist. His works have included numerous musicals, movie, television themes and hit songs. He has provided lyrics for John Barry, Charles Strouse, Matt Monro, Andrew Lloyd Webber, Quincy Jones, Hoyt Curtin, Lulu, Jule Styne, Henry Mancini, Meat Loaf, Michael Jackson, Elmer Bernstein, Michel Legrand, Hayley Westenra, A. R. Rahman, Marvin Hamlisch and Debbie Wiseman.

AllMusic stated that "Black is perhaps best-known for his collaborations with Andrew Lloyd Webber, and for the James Bond theme songs he co-wrote with composer John Barry: 'Thunderball', 'Diamonds Are Forever' and 'The Man with the Golden Gun'."

Early life

He was born Donald Blackstone in London, the youngest of five children of Russian Jewish immigrants from Ukraine, Morris and Betsy (née Kersh) Blackstone. His father worked as a garment presser and his mother in a clothes shop and during his childhood the family lived in a council flat in Tornay House, Shore Place, South Hackney. He attended Cassland Road School and enjoyed visits to the Hackney Empire, which was then a music hall and to the cinema to watch James Cagney films.

Career

Early career
He began his music industry career as an office boy with a music publishing firm, and later worked as a song-plugger. He also had a brief spell as a comic.

He was personal manager to the singer Matt Monro for many years and also provided songs for him (usually writing English language lyrics to continental songs). These included "Walk Away" and "If I Never Sing Another Song" (music: Udo Jürgens) and "For Mamma" (music: Charles Aznavour).

Film work
Black's first film work was the lyrics for the theme of the James Bond entry Thunderball (1965). His association with the Bond series continued over several decades, with Diamonds Are Forever and The Man with the Golden Gun, in collaboration with John Barry, and Surrender for Tomorrow Never Dies and The World Is Not Enough, in collaboration with David Arnold.

Black's film work culminated when he collaborated with Barry on the title song of 1966's Born Free, which won the Oscar for Best Song and provided a hit for Matt Monro. Pianist Roger Williams made the US Top 40 with an instrumental version. The song was nominated for Song of the Year at the 1967 Grammy Awards. The movie's producer, Sam Jaffe, was not impressed with the song, fearing that Black had made too much of a political comment in the lyric, and initially had the film printed without it on the soundtrack. When it became a US hit, he relented and had the film reprinted, commenting to Black, "It grows on you," after the song won the Oscar.

Black later collaborated with Barry on The Tamarind Seed, Out of Africa, Dances with Wolves, and an ill-fated Broadway musical, The Little Prince and the Aviator. In 1967, Lulu took the Black-Mark London title song of the film To Sir, with Love to No. 1 on the Billboard Hot 100. Black received his second Oscar nomination for Best Song with the title theme, written with Elmer Bernstein, of the 1969 John Wayne western, True Grit. That same year, he partnered with Quincy Jones for the theme song of the Michael Caine film, The Italian Job, "On Days Like These". He received a third Oscar nomination for the title song of the 1972 film Ben, a US No. 1 hit for Michael Jackson, which Black had written with Walter Scharf. Further Oscar nominations came for "Wherever Love Takes Me" (music: Elmer Bernstein), from 1974 film Gold, and "Come to Me" (music: Henry Mancini) from 1976's The Pink Panther Strikes Again.

In addition, Black teamed with Charles Strouse on the songs "Growing Up Isn't Easy" and "Anything Can Happen on Halloween" for the 1986 HBO film The Worst Witch, based on the children's book by Jill Murphy. Walt Disney commissioned him to write songs for the direct-to-video film Beauty and the Beast: The Enchanted Christmas.

Musical theatre
Black's stage credits include the musicals Billy (music: John Barry), Bar Mitzvah Boy (music: Jule Styne), Dear Anyone (music: Geoff Stephens), Budgie (music: Mort Shuman) and several Andrew Lloyd Webber shows: the 1979 song-cycle, Tell Me on a Sunday, which was performed by Marti Webb (whom Black also managed for a time); Aspects of Love, which propelled Michael Ball to stardom; and, together with Christopher Hampton, the musical adaptation of the Billy Wilder film Sunset Boulevard. The latter brought Black and Hampton a Tony Award for Best Book.

Tell Me on a Sunday was incorporated into Song and Dance. This was later adapted for a Broadway production starring Bernadette Peters, for which she won a Tony award as Best Actress in a Musical. Sarah Brightman performed for a video recording of the show at the end of its West End run and also released "Unexpected Song", from that musical, as a single.

With Geoff Stephens he produced a concept album of a "revuesical" entitled Off The Wall.

In 2002, he worked with the Indian composer A. R. Rahman on the musical Bombay Dreams. In 2004, Black's second musical collaboration with Hampton, Frank Wildhorn's Dracula, the Musical, debuted on Broadway. He also collaborated with John Barry once more, on the musical Brighton Rock. Based on the Graham Greene novel, it debuted at the Almeida Theatre, London, in 2004. In 2006, Black created the lyrics for the musical adaptation of the book Feather Boy, for the National Theatre in London.

In 2011, Black wrote the lyrics alongside composer Frank Wildhorn for the 2011 Broadway production of Bonnie & Clyde, which premiered at the Gerald Schoenfeld Theatre on 22 November 2011 and closed four weeks later due to poor ticket sales, despite the general public giving the show high praise for its score and the lead actors Jeremy Jordan (as Clyde Barrow) and Laura Osnes (as Bonnie Parker). The cast recording, however, became one of Wildhorn and Black's most successful musical scores.

In 2013, he again worked with Christopher Hampton and Andrew Lloyd Webber on Stephen Ward the Musical. In 2015, he wrote the lyrics for Mrs Henderson Presents, with George Fenton and Simon Chamberlin composing the music. In 2019, he collaborated with David Arnold on the music for a television version of The Tiger Who Came to Tea.

In 2020, he was reported to be working on a musical version of The Third Man, and reworking the show Feather Boy.

Radio broadcasting 
Black presented a Sunday night show on BBC Radio 2 from 2013 to 2020, which featured classic songs and songwriters of the 20th century, paid a weekly tribute to Matt Monro, whom he managed, and included many of his showbiz encounter stories. He took over this slot from David Jacobs.

Legacy
In 1993, Play It Again released Born Free – The Don Black Songbook, which remains the only album to date which consists solely of songs co-written by the lyricist.

In 2007, Black was inducted into the Songwriters Hall of Fame. That same year, Black was credited on "Sexy Lady", the 2007 debut single and hit for rapper Yung Berg, which sampled the Black-Barry theme for Diamonds Are Forever.

On 17 August 2008, the tribute concert Lyrics by Don Black was held at the London Palladium, featuring performances of Black's songs by a selection of guest artists. The evening, hosted by Michael Parkinson and recorded for broadcast by BBC Radio 2, included an exclusive performance of two songs from Black's new musical, The Count of Monte Cristo. The concert included contributions from Lee Mead, Gary Barlow, Elkie Brooks, Craig David, Maria Friedman, Joe Longthorne, Lulu, Peter Grant, Raza Jaffrey, Matt Rawle, Ryan Molloy, Marti Webb, Jonathan Ansell, Hayley Westenra, Phil Campbell and Mica Paris. The singers were accompanied by the Royal Philharmonic Orchestra, led by Mike Dixon and with guest conductors Michel Legrand and David Arnold.

In October 2013, a special concert to celebrate Black's work was held at London's Royal Festival Hall, featuring a lengthy interview with the composer by Michael Grade, interspersed by performances of his songs by artists such as Michael Ball, Maria Friedman, Katie Melua, and Marti Webb. The concert was recorded for television and first shown on BBC Four in early January 2014.

Personal life 
Black lives in London, England. His wife of nearly 60 years, Shirley, died in March 2018. In May 2020, he was treated in hospital for COVID-19.

Black's elder brother, Michael Black, a showbusiness booking agent, was married to singer Julie Rogers until his death in November 2018.

See also
 Songs with lyrics by Don Black
Ray of Hope (1991)(released 2007, 3 Ships 22nd Anniversary Album) music by Jon Anderson and Mike Marshall

Musical theatre credits 

 Maybe That's Your Problem (1971) – co-written with Walter Scharf and Lionel Chetwynd
 Billy (1974) – music by John Barry, adapted by Dick Clement and Ian La Frenais
 Bar Mitzvah Boy (1978) – music by Jule Styne, book by Jack Rosenthal
 Tell Me on a Sunday (1979, revised 2003), later incorporated into Song & Dance (1982) – music by Andrew Lloyd Webber
 Abbacadabra (1983) – music and lyrics by Benny Andersson and Björn Ulvaeus
 Dear Anyone (1983) – music by Geoff Stephens, book by Jack Rosenthal
 Merlin (1983) – music by Elmer Bernstein
 The Little Prince and the Aviator (1983) – music by John Barry, book by Hugh Wheeler
 Budgie (1988) – music by Mort Shuman, book by Keith Waterhouse and Willis Hall
 Aspects of Love (1989) – music by Lloyd Webber; lyrics with Charles Hart
 Starlight Express (1992) – additional lyrics; lyrics by Richard Stilgoe, music by Andrew Lloyd Webber
 Radio Times (1992) – additional lyrics with Chris Walker; written by Noel Gay and Abi Grant
 Sunset Boulevard (1993) – music by Lloyd Webber; lyrics with Christopher Hampton
 The Goodbye Girl (1997) – music by Marvin Hamlisch, book by Neil Simon
 Dracula (2001) – music by Frank Wildhorn, lyrics with Christopher Hampton
 Bombay Dreams (2002) – music by AR Rahman, book by Meera Syal and Thomas Meehan
 Dance of the Vampires (2002) – additional lyrics; music and lyrics by Jim Steinman, lyrics by Michael Kunze, book by Steinman, Kunze and David Ives
 Whistle Down the Wind (2002 tour version) – additional lyrics; music by Lloyd Webber, lyrics by Steinman, book by Patricia Knop
 Romeo and Juliet – The Musical (2002)
 Feather Boy (2006)
 Bonnie & Clyde (musical) (2011) – music by Frank Wildhorn
 Stephen Ward (2013) – music by Lloyd Webber; lyrics with Hampton
 Mrs Henderson Presents (2015) – music by George Fenton and Simon Chamberlin

Bibliography
 Wrestling with Elephants'' (The Authorized Biography of Don Black) by James Inverne, Sanctuary Publishing, 2003

References

External links
Official Don Black website

Don Black (BBC Radio London)
Interview with Don Black in International Songwriters Association's "Songwriter Magazine"

1938 births
Living people
People from South Hackney
BBC Radio 2 presenters
Best Original Song Academy Award-winning songwriters
Golden Globe Award-winning musicians
Broadway composers and lyricists
Tony Award winners
Jewish songwriters
English lyricists
English songwriters
English musical theatre lyricists
English Jews
Officers of the Order of the British Empire
Ivor Novello Award winners